Loppi (Japanese: ロッピー) is Japan's most popular self-service electronic ticket dispensing system, providing instant print tickets in venues such as museums. Tickets are typically printed and paid for at the store's counter, which also allows people who do not own credit or debit cards to purchase their tickets.

The system was originally developed and is still owned by the  Lawson chain of convenience stores (Konbini) and also is used to provide couponing and rewards systems. The name Loppi is an abbreviation of Lawson online shopping.

External links
 http://www.lawson.co.jp/loppi/index.html (In Japanese)

E-commerce in Japan